Bror Valdemar Lillqvist (20 November 1918 in Pedersöre – 2 February 1983) was a Finnish tradesman, union representative and politician. He was a member of the Parliament of Finland from 1966 until his death in 1983.

References

1918 births
1983 deaths
People from Pedersöre
Swedish-speaking Finns
Social Democratic Party of Finland politicians
Members of the Parliament of Finland (1966–70)
Members of the Parliament of Finland (1970–72)
Members of the Parliament of Finland (1972–75)
Members of the Parliament of Finland (1975–79)
Members of the Parliament of Finland (1979–83)